Zenaide Vieira (born June 25, 1985 in Jundiaí, São Paulo) is a Brazilian steeplechase runner. She won the bronze medal for the 3000 metres steeplechase at the 2007 Pan American Games in Rio de Janeiro, with a time of 9:55.71.

Vieira represented Brazil at the 2008 Summer Olympics in Beijing, where she competed for the women's 3000 metres steeplechase. She ran in the third and last heat against sixteen other athletes, including Spain's Marta Domínguez, who was considered a heavy favorite in this event. Unfortunately, she was unable to cross the finish line, and most importantly, to complete the entire race at the end of her heat.

Vieira is a full-time member of Associação Profissionalizante BM&F in São Caetano do Sul, São Paulo, being coached and trained by Clodoaldo Lopes do Carmo.

References

External links

Profile – UOL Esporte 
NBC 2008 Olympics profile

Brazilian female steeplechase runners
Brazilian female middle-distance runners
Living people
Olympic athletes of Brazil
Athletes (track and field) at the 2007 Pan American Games
Athletes (track and field) at the 2008 Summer Olympics
Athletes from São Paulo
1985 births
Pan American Games bronze medalists for Brazil
Pan American Games medalists in athletics (track and field)
Medalists at the 2007 Pan American Games